The following list shows the recipients for the Country Music Association Award for Song of the Year. This Award goes to the songwriter(s) and is for artistic achievement in songwriting. Any Country Music song with original words and music is eligible based upon the song’s Country singles chart activity during the eligibility period.

It was first handed out at the inaugural 1967 CMA Awards to Dallas Frazier for his song "There Goes My Everything" which had been popularised at that time by Jack Greene. Song of the Year is awarded to the songwriters rather than the artist (unless the artist helped to co-write the song). To date, thirteen men: Dallas Frazier (1967), Bobby Russell (1968), Bob Ferguson (1969), Kris Kristofferson (1970), Freddie Hart (1971-2), Kenny O'Dell (1973), Don Wayne (1974), John Denver (1975), Larry Weiss (1976), Richard Leigh (1978), Don Schlitz (1979), Lee Greenwood (1985) and Vince Gill (1996) and six women: K.T. Oslin (1988), Gretchen Peters (1995), Jennifer Nettles (2008), Kimberly Perry (2011), Lori McKenna (2016) and Taylor Swift (2017) have won the Song of the Year award with a solo composition.

To date, only three songs, "Easy Loving",  "Always on My Mind" and "He Stopped Loving Her Today", have received the award in consecutive years and only Freddie Hart, Don Schlitz, Vince Gill and Lori McKenna have won in consecutive years.

Recipients

2020's

2010's

2000's

1990's

1980's

1970's

1960's

Category facts

Most wins

Most nominations

References 

Country Music Association Awards